Jerry Franck is a Luxembourg-born filmmaker best known for producing the documentary Chau, Beyond the Lines for which he received an Academy Award for Best Documentary (Short Subject) nomination at the 88th Academy Awards, with Courtney Marsh.

References

External links
 
 

Living people
Luxembourgian film producers
Year of birth missing (living people)